( "house-protector", an inflected compound of vāstos, the genitive of vāstu "house", and pati "lord")  is a Rigvedic deity that presides over the foundation of a house or homestead, mentioned in Mandala 7.55 of the Rigveda. Some claim it to be another name for Rudra, an avatar of Shiva. In the Rigveda, Vāstoṣpati is also referred to as pṛdāku-sānu, or 'he whose back is speckled'. As a topic, Vastuvidya, also known as Vāstuśāstra, contains regulations about residential building construction and which sites are chosen for this purpose. The 52nd chapter of the Bṛhat Saṃhitā is entirely devoted to the topic of Vastuvidya, including the house layout, proportions, orientations of different areas of the house, and how construction varies for kings, officials, and by caste.

Vāstu means the site for building and also the house. Hence vāstu pūjā means the worship of the site chosen for building a temple or a house. It is treated as a must for safe and sound construction.

References 

Rigvedic deities